Cor!!, a British comic book, was launched in June 1970 by IPC (International Publishing Corporation), their sixth new comic in just over a year. Cor!! was edited by Bob Paynter.

The comic had 32 pages and included full-colour front and back pages and centre spread.  It depicted traditional British characters, albeit with a slight tweak.  The unruly schoolkids of The Gaswork Gang echoed The Bash Street Kids of The Beano, Tomboy was firmly in the Minnie the Minx vein, whilst Tricky Dicky seemed like a version of Roger the Dodger, albeit with longer hair and shorter trousers.

The first Cor!! featured Gus Gorilla on the front cover, drawn by Mike Lacey. The strip was in the shape of a glass, to promote the free fruit drink that came with this issue. The comic's most popular strip was Ivor Lott and Tony Broke, a classic tale of two boys – one rich, one poor, with the latter usually the victor of the many battles they had.  The strip continued long after the comic closed, finally ending in the last edition of Buster in January 2000.

Another popular strip, Whacky, debuted in the first edition, initially in a half-page format, sharing space with readers' letters.  The strip later added the tagline "He’s always getting whacked" to emphasize the story of a schoolboy who is regularly caned by his sadistic teacher – the equally appropriately named Mr. Thwackery.

The first line-up changes occurred in the 1970 "Bonfire" issue when five new features debuted. 1972 saw three newcomers in the New Year issue, including Victorian miser Jasper the Grasper and Frankie Stein – Teenage Werewolf. One notable later strip featured the BBC comedians The Goodies.  Drawn by Joe Colquhoun, the double-page feature lasted the whole of 1973.

Four years and 210 issues later the comic was eventually merged with Buster in June 1974, symptomatic of the diminishing market for British comics - though several further titles were launched by IPC and other publishers during the next few years. The long-running Lion and Scorcher also disappeared in 1974. The Cor!! name was kept alive by summer specials and annuals, finally ending in 1986.

Recurring features 
 Andy's Ants
 Chalky 
The Chumpions
 Donovan's Dad
 Fiends and Neighbours — later reprinted in Scream!
 Football Madd
 Frankie Stein – Teenage Werewolf
 The Gaswork Gang
 The Goodies
 Gus the Gorilla
 Herbie the Helicopter
 Hire a Horror
 Ivor Lott and Tony Broke
 Jack Pott
 Jasper the Grasper
 Jelly Baby 
 Kid Chameleon
 Little Geyser
 Night Mare
 Rat-Trap — starring Dr. Ratty Ratx
 Swopper Stan
 The Slimms
 Tell-Tale Tess
 Teacher's Pet
 Tomboy
 Tricky Dicky
 Whacky
 Willy Worry
 Wonder Worm
 Young MacDonald's Farm

Fleetway and IPC Comics titles
Comics magazines published in the United Kingdom
Defunct British comics
British humour comics
1970 comics debuts
1974 comics endings
Magazines established in 1970
Magazines disestablished in 1974